In physical optics, the Cotton–Mouton effect is the birefringence in a liquid in the presence of a constant transverse magnetic field. It is a similar but stronger effect than the Voigt effect (in which the medium is a gas instead of a liquid). The electric analog is the Kerr effect.

When a linearly polarized wave propagates perpendicularly to a magnetic field (e.g. in a magnetized plasma), it can become elliptized. Because a linearly polarized wave is some combination of in-phase X and O modes, and because X and O waves propagate with different phase velocities, there is elliptization of the emerging beam. As the waves propagate, the phase difference (δ) between EX and EO increases.

See also
 Cotton effect

References

Magneto-optic effects
Liquids